The Warriors: The Original Motion Picture Soundtrack is the soundtrack to the 1979 film The Warriors. The soundtrack was released on March 16, 1979 by A&M Records.

Background 
The album features music by Barry De Vorzon, Joe Walsh, Arnold McCuller and others. Many of the tracks are also included in the 2005 video game The Warriors.

Track listing

Charts

Personnel 
Jack Adelman - Mastering
Bob Babbitt - Bass
Phillip Ballou - Vocals (Background)
Billie Barnum - Vocals (Background)
Ben Benay - Guitar
'Crusher' Bennett - Percussion
Michael Brecker - Trumpet
Randy Brecker - Tenor Saxophone
Chevy Chase - Vocals (Background)
Desmond Child - Vocals
Gary Coleman - Percussion
Susan Collins - Vocals (Background)
Jim Crotty - Engineer
Bill Cuomo - Keyboards
Rocky Davis - Keyboards
Barry De Vorzon - Arranger, Synthesizer
Victor Feldman - Percussion
Joe Ferla - Associate Producer, Engineer, Remixing
Venetta Fields - Vocals (Background)
Diana Grasselli - Vocals (Background)
Ed Greene - Drums
Paul Griffin - Arranger, Clavinet, Organ, Piano (Electric), Synthesizer, Vocals (Background)
Ula Hedwig - Vocals (Background)
Jeff Hendrickson - Engineer
Mitch Holder - Guitar
Neil Jason - Bass
Jordan Kaplan - Clavinet
Harry Kim - Trumpet
Clydie King - Vocals (Background)
Russ Kunkel - Drums
David Landau - Guitar
Jeff Layton - Guitar
Joe Lopes - Engineer
Gavin Lurssen - Mastering
Robert Mack - Bass, Guitar
Tom Malone - Horn Arrangements, Trombone
Pat Martin - Engineer, Remixing
Kenny Mason - Trumpet
Greg Mathieson - Keyboards
Hugh McCracken - Harmonica
Arnold McCuller - Vocals (Background)
Monique McGuffin - Production Coordination
Boris Menart - Engineer
Cliff Morris - Guitar
Rob Mounsey - Arranger, Piano, Piano (Electric)
Steve Nathanson - Vocals (Background)
Christopher Parker - Drums
Mike Porcaro - Bass
Reinie Press - Bass
Elliott Randall - Guitar
Genya Ravan - Vocals
Artie Ripp - Vocals (Background)
Gary Roberts - Vocals (Background)
Alan Rubin - Trumpet
Neftali Santiago - Drums, Percussion, Rhythm Arrangements
Allan Schwartzberg - Syndrum
Clark Spangler - Synthesizer
David Stout - Trombone
David Tofani - Alto Saxophone
Gary Ulmer - Engineer
Ian Underwood - Synthesizer
Myriam Naomi Valle - Vocals (Background)
Kenny Vance - Vocal Harmony, Vocals (Background)
Luther Vandross - Vocals (Background)
Carlos Vega - Drums
Maria Vidal - Vocals (Background)
Joe Vitale - Drums
Joe Walsh - Arranger, Guitar
Carlos Wilson - Arranger, Flute, Guitar, String Arrangements, Vocals

References

Soundtrack
Joe Walsh albums
Action film soundtracks
1979 soundtrack albums
A&M Records soundtracks
Thriller film soundtracks